Askrova is an island in Kinn Municipality in Vestland county, Norway. The population of the  island (2001) was 143, with most residents living on the south and west shores of the island. Askrova Chapel is located on the island.

The main industry for the island is fishing. In 1936, there was a record catch of herring at Askrova. It was the biggest catch to date in Vestland county.

See also
List of islands of Norway

References

Islands of Vestland
Kinn